Fawzi Omar Ahmed Al-Issawi (born 27 February 1960 in Benghazi) is a former Libyan football midfielder. He was awarded best player of 1982 African Cup of Nations.

Honours

Personnel
 Best player of the 1982 African Cup of Nations
 Best scorer of the 1985 African Cup Winners' Cup with 5 goals
 Best player of the century in Libya

With Al-Nasr SC
Libyan Premier League
 Champion in 1987
 Runner-up in 1978, 1984
Libyan Cup:
 Winner 1997

With the Libyan national team
 Runner-up of the 1982 African Cup of Nations in Libya
 Winner of the 1980 Islamic Tournament Cup in Malaysia
 Winner of the 1977 School Cup

References

External links 
 

1960 births
Living people
People from Benghazi
Libyan footballers
Libya international footballers
Association football midfielders
Al-Nasr SC (Benghazi) players
1982 African Cup of Nations players
Libyan Premier League players